The Men's madison was held on 18 October 2015. 16 teams participated over a distance of 50 km (200 laps), with sprints every 20 laps awarding 5, 3, 2 or 1 point to the first four; teams are ranked by lap gains on their opponents, then points between teams on the same lap.

Results

References

Men's madison
European Track Championships – Men's madison